ICI-199,441 is a drug which acts as a potent and selective κ-opioid agonist, and has analgesic effects. It is a biased agonist of the KOR, and is one of a relatively few KOR ligands that is G protein-biased rather than β-arrestin-biased.

See also
U-47700
U-50488
U-69,593

References

Acetamides
Biased ligands
Chloroarenes
Kappa-opioid receptor agonists
Pyrrolidines
Synthetic opioids